Leonard Edmondson (1916-2002) was an American Abstract expressionist painter and printmaker.

Biography
Edmondson was born on June 12, 1916 in Sacramento, California. He attended the Los Angeles City College and then the University of California, Berkeley where he earned both his B.A. and M.A.. He went on to serve in the Military Intelligence Corps (United States Army) from 1942 through 1946.  

When he left the Army and returned to California he began his teaching career at Pasadena City College. He also taught at the Otis Art Institute and California State University, Los Angeles. In 1973 his book "Etching" was published. 

In 1950 Edmondson had his first solo show at the Felix Landau Gallery followed by shows at the de Young Museum and the Pasadena Museum of California Art. In 1960 Edmondson was the recipient of a Guggenheim Fellowship. An interview with Edmondson was included in the 1966-1967 "Art and Artists" radio program series which is archived at the Smithsonian Institution's Archives of American Art.  

Edmondson's work is in the collections of the Brooklyn Museum the National Gallery of Art, the Metropolitan Museum of Art.

Edmondson died on July 23, 2002 in West Covina, California.

References

External links
images of Edmondson's work on ArtNet

1916 births
2002 deaths
Ritchie Boys
20th-century American artists